Ann Trow Lohman  (May 6, 1812 – April 1, 1878), better known as Madame Restell, was a British-born American abortion provider who practiced in New York City.

Early life 
Ann Trow was born in Painswick, Gloucestershire, England in 1812 to John and (Mary) Ann Trow (nee Lewis). Her father was a labourer. At the age of fifteen, she started work as a maid in a butcher's family.

Career
At the age of sixteen, she married Henry Sommers, an alcoholic tailor from Wiltshire. After three years living in England, they emigrated to New York in 1831 where Sommers died of Typhoid in 1833. Ann Trow Sommers was left alone with an infant daughter, Caroline, and forced to make a living as a seamstress and midwife.

Ann remarried in 1836, to a German–Russian immigrant, Charles Lohman. Charles Lohman worked in the printing industry, and at the time was a printer for the New York Herald. Lohman was a radical and freethinker, a friend and colleague of George Matsell, the publisher of the radical journal the Free Inquirer. With Matsell, Lohman was involved in the publication of Robert Dale Owen's book Moral Physiology; or, a Brief and Plain Treatise on the Population Question (1831) and Charles Knowlton's Fruits of Philosophy; or, The Private Companion of Young Married People (1831). 

Ann's brother, Joseph Trow, had also emigrated to New York, and was working as a sales assistant in a pharmacy. Ann continued to develop an interest in women's health.

Charles and Ann developed a story to validate Ann's interests in midwifery and women's health. According to their story, she had travelled to Europe to train in midwifery with a renowned French physician named Restell. She began selling patent medicine, and (probably in partnership with her husband and brother) creating birth control products such as "preventative powders" and "Female Monthly Pills", advertised under the name "Madame Restell". She sold these products through the post and performed house visits. When these "Monthly Pills" proved insufficient for a woman to end a pregnancy and thus maintain good standing in society, Restell devised another solution. Self-professed doctors and pharmacists, she and her husband became surgeons. The new title ensured more profitable procedures could be performed under the same legal penalty given for offering medication-induced abortions. Abortifacients used in this era were often blends of herbs such as ergot, calomel, aloe, or black hellebore. These were thought to upset the digestive tract, inducing a miscarriage. Surgical abortions included rupturing the amniotic sac, or dilating the cervix (premature labor), or even in-utero decapitation.

Madame Restell advertised her services as a "Female Physician" in newspapers such as the Herald and even the New York Times. She and her husband Charles operated out of a large brownstone mansion on the northeast corner of Fifth Avenue and 52nd Street.

When Restell began her business, abortions were hardly illegal. Only surgical abortions were forbidden, and this was only after the quickening, that is, when the woman started to feel the fetus move (this was typically around 4 months time). Soon, Restell's success began to attract copiers and competition. This drew the attention of the AMA, which officially launched a campaign in 1857 to end abortion.  In order to rally support for their cause, the AMA targeted Restell, the most celebrated abortion provider and deemed her the enemy. The term "Restellism" became a euphemism for abortion. With the swift changes of law in New York, Restell was constantly being hounded by authorities and anti-abortion crusaders to end her practice.

She was met with opposition from the press. Enoch E. Camp and George Wilkes' National Police Gazette covered New York's "crime news" and detailed stories about theft, abortion, and rape. Coverage was not limited to New York but rather extended to major cities throughout the United States and Europe. The Gazette claimed that in addition to performing abortions, "...most of the abandoned infants found almost daily throughout the city came from her [Restell's] establishment."

Conservative editors such as Samuel Jenks Smith of the New York Sunday Morning News also publicly condemned Restell's profession. On July 7, 1839—the earliest press's attack on Restell—his editorial claimed her business "...strikes at the root of all social order." According to Smith, doctors believed Restell was engaging in dangerous work, and that "...what she was doing was impossible without endangering the lives of the patients." Her work was considered "sinful".

Madame Restell became so well known throughout New York City that copies of her trials were published in the Times and the Police Gazette. She was listed as a New York City attraction in tour guides.

Legal troubles 
In 1840, a patient named Maria Purdy accused Restell of causing tuberculosis through the abortion procedure. The press erupted with anger against Restell, calling her "the monster in human shape" and charging her with acts against God. Restell promised monetary compensation to anyone who could prove that her methods were dangerous, and while she was initially found guilty, her appeal overturned said verdict. Her uneasy relationship with public opinion continued.

Mary Applegate was an unmarried woman, a mistress, who had been sent to Madame Restell from Philadelphia by her illicit lover. The father had arranged for Restell to adopt the baby for other people. Applegate was unaware of this deal until she had returned to Philadelphia and was greeted coldly by her former lover. Applegate then went back to Restell to ask for her child back, but Restell claimed to know nothing of the infant. Restell immediately was painted as the villain by the press in publications such as the New York Medical and Surgical Reporter.

In 1841, Mary Rogers was found dead in the Hudson River. Newspapers suggested that she had died during an abortion carried out by Restell.

Abortion was soon outlawed by the state of New York in 1845. This law further restricted the previous laws from a decade earlier. An abortion that resulted in the death of the mother or was performed after the "quickening" was second degree manslaughter. A new addendum to the law made selling abortifacients or performing abortions at any stage during the pregnancy a misdemeanor punishable by a mandatory year in jail. Additionally, women who sought after an abortion or attempted their own abortion were fined $1000. Abortion legally became defined as an obscene subject and was no longer covered in the papers. Women were no longer allowed to freely discuss abortion. Restell skirted the legalities by advertising her services as methods to regulate menses.

In 1847, Charges were again brought against Restell for performing an abortion, which led to a conviction.
This conviction, however, was "universally hailed," and media coverage of the trial prompted discussion surrounding for-profit abortions performed by physicians. Furthermore, it was noted that the victims were typically "poor, uneducated women" from New England and Connecticut who came to New York for abortions.
Maria Bodine was sent to Madame Restell by her master so that she could procure an abortion from Restell. Restell determined that Maria was too far along to have an abortion, but Maria's master insisted. Finally, he paid Restell heavily, and she agreed to perform Maria's abortion. Maria then returned to her job as a maid. She fell ill and upon visiting a doctor, was forced to admit her abortion. Restell was taken to trial. During this case, Madame Restell's defense painted Bodine as a "loose" woman whose injuries were a result of syphilis and had nothing to do with Restell, and Maria Bodine's lawyers cast Restell as a godless incompetent woman. Restell lost the case and was charged with a misdemeanor and a one-year prison sentence which was on Blackwell's Island.

After Madame Restell finished her sentence, she reworked her business. She removed surgical abortions entirely, and concentrated her efforts on pills and her boarding house. In 1854, Restell applied for U.S. citizenship and was granted it. Evidence given in a breach-of-promise case in 1854 suggests Restell and her husband were charging between $50 and $100 per abortion at this time and had a regular clientele. Before the 1845 law, Restell was charging her clients on a sliding scale according to social class. Many of Restell's wealthier patients were charged upwards of $1,000. While Madame Restell reduced her business, the press did not leave her reputation to rest. She was dubbed "The Wickedest Woman in New York".

In 1855, Frederica Medinger, a German immigrant, approached Restell asking for a room to stay in until the birth of her child. According to Medinger, Restell gave her six pills at the time of the birth. A day after the birth, Medinger asked for her child and was told by Restell that the child had disappeared. Restell was accused of kidnapping and being too greedy. When Restell was taken to court, Medinger did not show. Many assumed Restell had paid her to drop the case. Restell was dismissed, and the woman and her baby were never heard of again. It is assumed the child was adopted through an arrangement by Restell.

The various reactions to Restell and her New York practice echoed general attitudes toward abortion in the United States. Traveling salesmen in cities such as Boston and Philadelphia heard of her financial success and sold pills to capitalize on similar profits. Before her own legal troubles, Restell heard stories of abortion providers in Philadelphia and Lowell, Massachusetts indicted for murder—indicators of growing opposition to the practice on a national scale. A similar case was that of Dr. John Stevens, a physician who performed an abortion on a young Boston woman named Gallagher. Her death, a consequence of this high-risk operation, prompted Stevens to be accused of murder.

Though the Civil War distracted many Americans from the abortion debate, its end allowed some physicians to return to their anti-abortion campaign.

"Since the embryo, they argued, was fully alive from the point of conception, abortion at any point, regardless of whether the mother had quickened or not—was murder pure and simple."

While some physician took clear moral stances on the issue, others found their campaign increased the likelihood that untrained physicians would be penalized, thereby creating the potential to advance the activists' own professional goals.

Madame Restell had amassed a fortune. She owned several plots of land, one of which featured an extravagant mansion. She had the finest horses, carriages, and silk dresses. The Civil War gave Restell the cover she needed to get her business back on her feet. Although she had been imprisoned once and accused numerous times, Restell appeared unscathed.

Arrest by Comstock 
Postal Inspector Anthony Comstock was an influential moral reformer, who sought not only to regulate sexual activity, but the very way society thought about sex. He considered any information about the prevention or termination of a pregnancy to be pornographic. In 1873, the U.S. Congress enacted the Comstock laws, which made it illegal to discuss or distribute anything considered obscene by the government. Breaking these laws was punishable by six months to five years in prison and a fine of $100-$2000.

Madame Restell was arrested by Comstock, who posed as a customer looking for birth control pills and took the police around the next day to have her arrested. Bail was set at $1,000. She was said to have reached into her purse to pull out $10,000, but the judge would accept only regular bail bonds, so Restell had to pay a bondsman. Following Restell's arrest in early 1878, a maid discovered her in the bathtub at her home on Fifth Avenue; she had slit her own throat on the morning of April 1, 1878. Upon her death, she was found to be worth between $500,000 to $600,000 ($12.4 million-$14.9 million in present-day terms).

Literature
 Ann Trow Lohman is acknowledged as the inspiration for Kate Manning's heroine Annie "Axie" Muldoon in her historical novel My Notorious Life, published on June 6, 2013 (UK) by Bloomsbury Publishing.
 Madame Restell is a prominent character in Marge Piercy's historical novel Sex Wars, which depicts the social and political climate surrounding women's sexual, physical, and reproductive activities during the Gilded Age.
 Restell features as a minor character in Gore Vidal's novel 1876.
 Restell is featured in Edward Rutherfurd's novel New York.
 Ann Trow Lohman is the subject of Jessica Bashline's play Wickedest Woman.

See also
Abortion
History of abortion
Patent medicine

References

Citations

Bibliography
 Carlson, A. Cheree (2009). The Crimes of Womanhood. Illinois: University for Illinois Press. pp. 111–136. .
 "End of a Criminal Life". New York Times. April 2, 1878.
 Olasky, Marvin (Summer 1986). "Advertising abortion in the 1830s and 1840s: Madame Restell Builds a Business". Journalism History. 13:2: 49–55.
 Knowlton, Charles (1891). Fruits of Philosophy: A Treatise on the Population Question. San Francisco: Reader's Library.
 Abbott, Karen. "Madame Restell: The Abortionist of Fifth Avenue". Smithsonian. Retrieved 2017-12-01. 
 "Madame Restell | American Abortionist". Encyclopedia Britannica. 
 Keller, Allan (1981). Scandalous Lady. New York: Atheneum. .
 Manning, Kate (June 6, 2009). "Abortion Wars, The First Time Around". The New York Times.

External links

 by Cynthia Watkins Richardson
"Sins of New York As 'Exposed' by the Police Gazette" (1930) by Edward van Every
"The Notorious Madame Restell: The Abortionist of Fifth Avenue" (2016) Bowery Boys Podcast

1812 births
1878 deaths
1870s suicides
Criminals from New York City
American abortion providers
People from Roosevelt Island
People from Painswick
Suicides in New York (state)
Suicides by sharp instrument in the United States
Burials at Sleepy Hollow Cemetery
19th-century American businesspeople
19th-century American businesswomen
English emigrants to the United States